Beyblade: Super Tournament Battle, also known as Beyblade V-Force: Super Tournament Battle and Bakuten Shoot Beyblade 2002: Nettou! Magne-tag Battle! (爆転シュートベイブレード2002 熱闘！マグネタッグバトル！) in Japan is a Beyblade 2002 role-playing video game. The game was released originally on December 19, 2002 in Japan and was later released in the west in 2003. It is based on the Beyblade V-Force season.

Gameplay
In the game, the player selects a Beyblade and a Beyblader to fight in a tournament, earning experience and Bey Points (BP) so they can buy better beyblade  super Tournament battle game play to its end when the player hits the launch button, the faster the Beyblade will revolve. Players can also get points if the player makes the Beyblade stop spinning or misses a launch.

The player earns four points or more if they destroy the opponent's Beyblade to pieces using a powerful assault from the Bit-Beast. In order to be capable of releasing a Bit-Beast, the player has to earn "Legend Power" points simply by hitting other Beyblades repeatedly. Bit-Beast assaults usually take a larger amount of energy from the adversary than normal assaults and they also increase the speed of the spins. The player can fight CPU opponents and/or human players.

Reception

The game was not well received by game reviews. IGN ranked it 2.5 out of 10, stating that "the concept couldn't be simpler and this is largely why there's no need to do it in videogame form, especially if the videogame is as poorly conceived as this".

References

External links
 Beyblade: Super Tournament Battle at GameFAQs

2002 video games
Beyblade games
GameCube-only games
GameCube games
Role-playing video games
Video games developed in Japan
Video games featuring protagonists of selectable gender
Multiplayer and single-player video games